Transitions Volume 2 is a DJ mix compilation album of tech house music by John Digweed, released by Renaissance Records.

Track listing

Abyss - "Mind Games (Digweed Cheeky Edit)" (3:37)
Abyss - "The Dreamer" (5:24)
Chaim EP - "Dana (Guy Gerber Mix)" (5:35)
Antena - "Camino del Sol (Joakim Remix)" (8:20)
Williams - "The Shivering (Pitch and Hold in Camera Obscura Remix)" (6:46)
Evil Hinko - "Gedankenhochsprung (Babicz Remix)" (4:49)
Bruce Aisher & G-Stylz - "Belong to Me (Dub - Digweed Cheeky Edit)" (3:02)
David K - "Boul de Nerf" (5:35)
Felix Houzer - "Mandolina" (5:17)
Dirk Technic - "I Love You (Smallboy Remix)" (6:34)
Guy Gerber - "Digital Memories" (3:00)
Bruce Aisher & G-Stylz - "Can't Get Enough" (4:04)
Dose3 - "Minds (Toby Neumann Mix)" (3:41)
Jackmate - "Manray (Digweed Cheeky Edit)" (6:10)

References

External links 
Discogs release page

John Digweed albums
2007 compilation albums